Aleksandr Purtov (born 27 October 1935) is a Soviet equestrian. He competed in two events at the 1964 Summer Olympics.

References

1935 births
Living people
Soviet male equestrians
Olympic equestrians of the Soviet Union
Equestrians at the 1964 Summer Olympics
Place of birth missing (living people)